The 1989 Segunda División Peruana, the second division of Peruvian football (soccer), was played by 20 teams. The tournament winner, Sport Boys was promoted to the 1990 Torneo Descentralizado.

Results

Zona Norte

Zona Sur

Liguilla

Promotion playoff

References
 La Campaña del Retorno : 1989

Peruvian Segunda División seasons
Peru2
2